The 1955 Swedish speedway season was the 1955 season of motorcycle speedway in Sweden.

Individual

Individual Championship
The 1955 Swedish Individual Speedway Championship final was held on 30 September in Stockholm. Rune Sörmander won the Swedish Championship.

Team

Team Championship
Monarkerna won division 1 and were declared the winners of the Swedish Speedway Team Championship.

The 1955 season proved to be a low point in terms of league teams. Only six teams lined up compared to 21 teams that competed just five years earlier in 1950. Vargarna, Smederna and Vikingarna did not compete.

References

Speedway leagues
Professional sports leagues in Sweden
Swedish
Seasons in Swedish speedway